Sir Tannatt William Edgeworth David  (28 January 1858 – 28 August 1934) was a Welsh Australian geologist and Antarctic explorer. A household name in his lifetime, David's most significant achievements were discovering the major Hunter Valley coalfield in New South Wales and leading the first expedition to reach the South Magnetic Pole. He also served with distinction in World War I.

Early life
David was born on 28 January 1858, in St. Fagans near Cardiff, Wales, the eldest son of the Rev. William David, a fellow of Jesus College, Oxford, a classical scholar and naturalist and his wife Margaret Harriette (née Thomson). His mother's cousin, William A. E. Ussher of the Geological Survey, first interested David in what was to be his life work.

At the age of 12, David went to Magdalen College School, Oxford in 1870. In 1876 he gained a classical scholarship to New College, Oxford. While there he was lectured by the famous John Ruskin and William Spooner. In 1878 he suffered a health breakdown and travelled to Canada and Australia to recuperate. Returning to Oxford, he attended lectures on geology by Sir Joseph Prestwich which stimulated his interest in the subject. After graduating as a Bachelor of Arts without honours in 1880, he spent the following two years in field study of the geology of Wales. In November 1881 he read his first paper, Evidences of Glacial Action in the Neighbourhood of Cardiff before the Cardiff Naturalists' Society. In the following year he briefly studied at the Royal School of Mines, London, under Professor J.W. Judd before accepting the position of Assistant Geological Surveyor to the Government of New South Wales, Australia.

Career in Australia
David took up his post in November 1882. In 1884 his report on the tin deposits in the New England district was published, and three years later it was expanded into the Geology of the Vegetable Creek Tin Mining Field, New England District. Apart from its scientific interest this was valuable in connection with the mining operations on this field, from which some £10,000,000 worth of tin was won. On 30 July 1885 he married Caroline (Cara) Mallett, principal of the Hurlstone Training College for Teachers, who had travelled to Australia in the same vessel with him.

In April 1886 he began surveying the Hunter Valley coalfields and in August discovered the Greta coal seam, which yielded over £50,000,000 worth of coal up to 1949. Much of his time during the next four years was spent near Maitland where he was still tracing and mapping the coal measures and reporting to the government on other matters of commercial value. David's assistant in 1890 was William Sutherland Dun.

In 1891 David was appointed Professor of Geology at the University of Sydney, a position he held until 1924.

David was not only a good scientist but very cultured, with a sense of humour, great enthusiasm, sympathy, and courtesy, and he quickly fitted into his new position. His department was housed in a small cottage, its equipment was poor, and he had no lecturers or demonstrators; but he gradually got better facilities and built up his department. In 1892 he was president of the geological section of the Australasian Association for the Advancement of Science at the Hobart meeting, and held the same position at Brisbane in 1895.

In 1896 David went to the Pacific atoll of Funafuti as part of an expedition under Professor William Sollas of Oxford in order to take borings which it was hoped would settle the question of the formation of coral atolls. There were defects in the boring machinery and the bore penetrated only slightly more than 100 feet (approx. 31 m). In 1897 David led a second expedition (that included George Sweet as second-in-command, and Walter George Woolnough) which succeeded in reaching a depth of 557 feet (170 m) after which he had to return to Sydney. He then organised a third expedition in 1898 which, under the leadership of Dr. Alfred Edmund Finckh, was successful in carrying the bore to 1114 feet (340 m). The results provided support for Charles Darwin's theory of subsidence, and the expeditions made David's name as a geologist. Cara accompanied him on the second expedition and published a well-received account called Funafuti, or Three Months on a Coral Island.

David's reputation was growing in Europe, and in 1899 he was awarded the Bigsby Medal by the Geological Society of London, and in 1900 he was elected Fellow of the Royal Society. From 1900 to 1907 he conducted field studies of glaciation in the Kosciusko plateau and Precambrian glaciation in South Australia.

In 1904 David was elected president of the Australasian Association for the Advancement of Science which met in Dunedin, and in 1906 he attended the International Geological Congress held in Mexico. On his way back to Australia he was able to see the Grand Canyon of the Colorado and to study the effect of the San Francisco earthquake.

Antarctic exploration 

In mid-1907, David was invited to join Ernest Shackleton's Antarctic Nimrod Expedition, and, in December, won Australian government funding for the expedition. The same month he left for New Zealand with Leo Cotton and Douglas Mawson, two of his former students. David was nearly 50 years of age and it was intended that he would stay only until April 1908, but en route to Antarctica on the  he altered his plans and decided to stay for the entire duration of the expedition.

From 5 to 11 March 1908, David led the first ascent of Mount Erebus, the only active volcano in Antarctica. David led the summit party consisting of Mawson, Alistair Mackay and himself, and there was a supporting party of three which it was afterwards decided should also attempt to reach the summit. In this they were successful in spite of a blizzard which barred their progress for a day and night. One member of the party had his feet badly frostbitten, and had to be left in camp before the final dash. David and four others reached the summit and the whole party returned to the base.

On 5 October, David led Mawson and Mackay on an attempt to reach the Magnetic South Pole. For 10 weeks the men followed the coast north supplementing their stores with a diet of seals and penguins. They then crossed the Drygalski Ice Tongue and turned inland. They still faced a  return journey and established a depot to enable them to transfer their load to one overladen sled and to remove the need to relay. On 16 January 1909, they finally arrived at the South Magnetic Pole and took possession of the region for the British Crown.

David had been appointed leader by Shackleton, but by the end of January, with all three of the party experiencing severe physical deterioration, David was increasingly unable to contribute. On 31 January, Mackay exerted his authority as the party's doctor and threatened to declare the Professor insane unless he gave written authority of leadership to Mawson. Mawson took command, writing in his diary on 3 February: "the Prof was now certainly partly demented". That day the party reached the coast line with perfect timing; within 24 hours they were collected by the Nimrod for the return trip to Cape Royds.

The expedition returned to New Zealand on 25 March 1909. When David returned to Sydney he was presented with the Mueller medal by the Australasian Association for the Advancement of Science at a rapturous official welcome. At Shackleton's request, David then went on a lecture tour and earned enough money to pay the expenses of publication of the two volumes on the geology of the expedition. He also wrote his Narrative of the Magnetic Pole Journey, which appeared in the second volume of Shackleton's Heart of the Antarctic.

In 1910, David became a Companion of the Order of St Michael and St George, and visiting England in connection with the scientific results of the Antarctic expedition, Oxford University awarded him the honorary degree of Doctor of Science. From 1911 to 1912, he provided public and practical support for the Japanese Antarctic Expedition, which was wintering in Sydney. In 1913, David was elected president of the Australasian Association for the Advancement of Science for the second time and in 1926, was presented with the Royal Geographical Society's Patron's Medal.

Australian Mining Corps

When World War I broke out in 1914, David was a strenuous supporter of the war effort, supporting the campaign for conscription. In August 1915, after reading reports about mining operations and tunnelling during the Gallipoli Campaign, along with Professor Ernest Skeats, a professor at the University of Melbourne, David wrote a proposal to Senator George Pearce, the Australian Defence Minister, suggesting that the government raise a military force to undertake mining and tunnelling. After the proposal was accepted, David used his advocacy and organisational abilities to set up the Australian Mining Corps, and on 25 October 1915 he was appointed as a major, at the age of 57.

The first contingent of the corps consisted of 1,300 officers and men that were initially organised into two battalions before being reorganised into three tunnelling companies, as well as an electrical and mechanical mining company. After departing Australia for the United Kingdom in February 1916, the corps arrived on the Western Front in May 1916. Given the title 'Geological Adviser to the Controllers of Mines in the First, Second and Third Armies', David became relatively independent and spent his time in geological investigations, using his expertise to advise on the construction of dugouts, trenches, and tunnels, the siting of wells for provision of pure drinking water from underground supplies, giving lectures, and producing maps. In September 1916 he fell to the bottom of a well he was examining, breaking two ribs and rupturing his urethra. He was invalided to London but returned to the Front in November, assuming the role of geological technical advisor to the British Expeditionary Force.

On 7 June 1917 his wartime contribution culminated in the mining of German positions in the Battle of Messines. In January 1918, David was awarded the Distinguished Service Order and in November he was promoted to lieutenant colonel. The war having concluded, he was demobilised in 1919. He was also Mentioned in Despatches twice.

Later life

In 1896 the Davids bought 26 acres (10.5 hectares) at Woodford, in the Blue Mountains, with an existing weatherboard cottage, two-roomed with two skillion rooms at the back. To emphasise his Welsh origins, Edgeworth David named the Woodford cottage ‘Tyn-y-Coed’, the 'house in the trees' (often mistranslated as 'the shack in the bush': 'ty' is a proper house in Welsh, not a mere hut).

In 1915 the Davids offered their home to the Red Cross convalescent home for the rehabilitation of injured servicemen and the Woodford Academy boys erected a flagstaff for the Union Jack and Red Cross flags for the soldiers in residence. When the Cooee marchers trooped past in November 1915 some of the wounded soldiers were brought up to the main road to greet the marchers.
Although they had work and commitments in Sydney, Woodford was the David's primary residence from 1899 until 1920. They retained the Woodford cottage as a favoured country retreat until Edgeworth's death in 1934.
Tyn-y-Coed was destroyed by bushfire in 1944 with only a chimney stump remaining. Its grounds are now occupied by eight modern houses, their gardens and adjoining bush.

In September 1920, David was created a Knight Commander of the Order of the British Empire for services during the war.

Returning to Australia, David purchased Coringah, a cottage in the Sydney suburb of Hornsby. He also took up a long-cherished project, the writing of a definitive work, The Geology of the Commonwealth of Australia. In 1921–22 David helped set up the Australian National Research Council and served as its first President. In 1924 he retired as Professor of Geology at the University of Sydney, the chair passing to his student Leo Cotton, a neighbour in Hornsby, New South Wales, whose brother Max Cotton created Lisgar Gardens in Hornsby. In 1928 he discovered what he believed were Precambrian fossils, creating controversy which remained until his death.

In 1931 he published the Geological Map of the Commonwealth and the accompanying Explanatory Notes, designed to be part of his Geology of the Commonwealth of Australia. He died in 1934 without being able to complete this work and was given a state funeral.

Legacy
David's The Geology of the Commonwealth of Australia was finally completed by his chosen collaborator, Associate Professor William R. Browne in 1950. Of his many papers, over 100 will be found listed in the Geological Magazine for January 1922. A travelling scholarship in his memory was founded at the University of Sydney in 1936.

The Edgeworth David Medal is named in his honour. It is awarded by the Royal Society of New South Wales for distinguished contributions by a young scientist under the age of thirty-five for work done mainly in Australia or its territories. The mineral davidite is named after him, as was the Edgeworth David Building (demolished 2006) at the University of Sydney and Edgeworth David Avenue in Hornsby, New South Wales where he spent his later years. He has been depicted on two Australian postage stamps. The Edgeworth David Building at Tighes Hill TAFE campus in the New South Wales Hunter Valley is named in his honour.

David Island, lying off Davis Peninsula in the Shackleton Ice Shelf in Antarctica, is named for him.

Edgeworth David Base is the name of a summer station in the Bunger Hills area of Antarctica. It has been maintained by Australia since 1986.

The suburb of Edgeworth in the Hunter Region, New South Wales, is named after David.

The Edgeworth David quarry in Seaham, New South Wales is named after David, who discovered varve shale there in 1914.

The boreholes on Funafuti, Tuvalu are known as David's Drill.

In 1968 he was honoured on a postage stamp issued by Australia Post.

Edgeworth David's daughter Margaret McIntyre was the first woman elected to the Parliament of Tasmania and was awarded the Order of the British Empire.

In 1999, the David wooded family estate Coringah, in the Northern Sydney suburb of Hornsby, was added to the New South Wales State Heritage Register, listed as Edgeworth David's House and Grounds. That same year, Hornsby Council acquired Coringah. Since 2016, the Edgeworth David Community Garden is located in the park which is called Edgeworth David Garden.

Edgeworth David Avenue is an east-west road bridging the Hornsby Shire suburbs of Hornsby, Waitara and Wahroonga.

References
Citations

Bibliography

Further reading
 

 
E. C. Andrews (1936). Memorial of T. W. Edgeworth David, The Geological Society of America.

External links 

 
 
 
 

1858 births
1934 deaths
Alumni of New College, Oxford
Australian Antarctic scientists
Australian Army officers
Australian Companions of the Distinguished Service Order
Australian Companions of the Order of St Michael and St George
Australian explorers
Australian geologists
Australian Knights Commander of the Order of the British Empire
Australian military personnel of World War I
British explorers of Antarctica
Explorers of Antarctica
Fellows of the Royal Society
People educated at Magdalen College School, Oxford
Academic staff of the University of Sydney
Welsh emigrants to colonial Australia
Wollaston Medal winners